Central Agricultural University is an agricultural university at Lamphelpat, Imphal in the Indian state of Manipur.

The Central Agricultural University was established by an act of Parliament, the Central Agricultural University Act 1992 (No.40 of 1992). The Act came into effect on 26 January 1993 with the issue of necessary notification by the Department of Agricultural Research and Education (DARE), Government of India. The university became functional with the joining of the first vice-chancellor on 13 September 1993.

The jurisdiction of the university extends to seven North-Eastern Hill States: Arunachal Pradesh, Manipur, Meghalaya, Mizoram, Sikkim, Nagaland and Tripura. It offers undergraduate teaching (B.V.Sc. & A.H.) and postgraduate teaching (M.V.Sc.), research and extension activities at College of Veterinary Sciences & Animal Husbandry, Selesih, Aizawl, Mizoram. It offers BSc (Agril) every year and MSc (Agril) in Agronomy, Plant Pathology, Horticulture, Genetics and Plant Breeding, Soil Science and Agricultural Chemistry, and Entomology. It imparts teaching in the field of Agriculture, Horticulture, Forestry, Fisheries, Agricultural Engineering, Veterinary Sciences and Food Technology in various constituent colleges spanning north-eastern states.

Like other Agricultural Universities, Central Agricultural University, Imphal has integrated programmes of teaching, research and extension education.

As per the mandate, the university has established 13 different constituent colleges, 6 KVKs, 6 Multi Technology Testing Centers: In six states at Manipur, Mizoram, Tripura, Arunachal Pradesh, Sikkim and Meghalaya 6 Vocational Training Centers: In six states at Manipur, Mizoram, Tripura, Arunachal Pradesh, Sikkim and Meghalaya.

Colleges
There are Thirteen colleges under CAU:
College of Horticulture & Forestry – Pasighat, Arunachal Pradesh
College of Post Graduate Studies in Agricultural Sciences – Umiam, Meghalaya
College of Veterinary Sciences & Animal Husbandry – Selesih, Aizawl, Mizoram
College of Agriculture – Imphal, Manipur
College of Fisheries – Lembucherra, Tripura
College of Agricultural Engineering and Post Harvest Technology (CAEPHT) – Gangtok, Sikkim
College of Home Science – Tura, Meghalaya
College of Horticulture – Thenzawl, Mizoram
College of Food Technology – Lamphelpat, Manipur
College of Agriculture – Kyrdemkulai, Meghalaya
College of Agriculture – Pasighat, Arunachal Pradesh
College of Horticulture – Bermiok, Sikkim
College of Veterinary Science and Animal Husbandry – Jalukie, Nagaland

Krishi Vigyan Kendras

Krishi Vigyan Kendra – Andro, Imphal East, Manipur
Krishi Vigyan Kendra – East Siang, Arunachal Pradesh
Krishi Vigyan Kendra – Aizawl, Mizoram
Krishi Vigyan Kendra – East Garo Hills, Meghalaya
Krishi Vigyan Kendra – South Garo Hills, Meghalaya
Krishi Vigyan Kendra – Sepahijala, Tripura

Area of Jurisdiction
The Central Agricultural University, Imphal located at Lamphelpat, Imphal West, Manipur has its area of jurisdiction over seven North-Eastern Hill (NEH) states of India except Assam.

References

External links

Agricultural universities and colleges in India
Education in Imphal
Universities in Manipur
Central universities in India
1993 establishments in Manipur
Agriculture in Manipur
Educational institutions established in 1993